Chiasmia monticolaria is a moth of the family Geometridae first described by John Henry Leech in 1897. It is found in Asia, including Taiwan.

Subspecies
Chiasmia monticolaria monticolaria
Chiasmia monticolaria notia Wehrli, 1940 (Taiwan)

References

Moths described in 1897
Macariini